Church Island is a medieval Christian monastery and National Monument located in Valentia Harbour, Ireland.

Location

History

The island was anciently a centre for iron smelting.

The monastery was established in the 7th century AD.

Excavations by M. J. O'Kelly in 1955–56 turned up the remnants of a wooden oratory and a cross inscribed with Ogham. It also gave evidence of the diet of the monks: cod, ballan wrasse, oats, barley, gannet, shag, cormorant, goose, duck, beef, mutton, pork, goat meat, horsemeat and seal.

Description

Contains the remains of a stone oratory, clochán (possibly a hospitium), and holy well.

References

Christian monasteries in the Republic of Ireland
Religion in County Kerry
Archaeological sites in County Kerry
National Monuments in County Kerry